Into the Light is the second studio album by American singer Phil Stacey. It is the followup to his 2008 self-titled debut which was released to country music. Into the Light is a CCM album released on Reunion Records. The album's final track, "Old Glory," was previously released as a promotional single during Stacey's 2008 tenure on Lyric Street Records. "You're Not Shaken", the first official single from the album, appeared on WOW Hits 2010.

Reception

Stephen Thomas Erlewine gave the album three-and-a-half stars out of five in his Allmusic review. He said that the more pop-oriented production was well-suited to his voice and that it was "a set of songs that work not just as inspirational numbers but also as adult pop tunes."

Track listing

Personnel
David Angell- violin
Brown Bannister- percussion
Steve Brewster- drums
Luke Brown- background vocals
Tom Bukovac- electric guitar
Chuck Butler- acoustic guitar, electric guitar
John Catchings- cello
David Davidson- violin
Scott Dente- acoustic guitar
Connie Ellisor- violin
Ben Glover- acoustic guitar
Jim Grosjean- viola
Micci Hagle- background vocals
Anthony LaMarchina- cello
Stephen Leweke- acoustic guitar
Tony Lucido- bass guitar
Jeremy Lutito- drums
Carl Marsh- string arrangements
Blair Masters- keyboards, piano
Jason McArthur- background vocals
Jerry McPherson- acoustic guitar, electric guitar
Dan Needham- drums
Michael O'Brien- background vocals
Mike Payne- electric guitar
Matt Pierson- bass guitar
F. Reid Shippen- percussion
Pam Sixfin- violin
Phil Stacey- piano, lead vocals, background vocals
Matt Stanfield- keyboards, piano, programming
Mary Kathryn Van Osdale- violin
Jason Webb- Hammond B-3 organ, synthesizer, Wurlitzer
Kris Wilkinson- viola

Chart performance

References

2009 albums
Phil Stacey albums
Reunion Records albums
Albums produced by Brown Bannister